Gin'yō Ika-shū (銀葉夷歌集) is a Japanese kyōka anthology in five volumes.

Compiler and date 
Gin'yō Ika-shū, an anthology of kyōka poetry, was compiled by Seihakudō Gyōfū (生白 堂行風) and first printed in the second month of Enpō 7 (1679) by Iseya San'uemon (伊勢屋山右衛門) in Osaka.

Title 
Gin'yō Ika-shū was Gyōfū's third collection, following Kokin Ikyoku-shū and Gosen Ikyoku-shū. The names of these earlier two works are derived from the first two imperial anthologies of waka poetry, the Kokin Waka-shū and Gosen Waka-shū, and so it appears Gyōfū intended to follow this pattern in calling this work the Kin'yō Ikyoku-shū (金葉夷曲集) after the Kin'yō Waka-shū, but for whatever reason he changed his mind, with both the preface (序題) and title page (内題) showing signs of having been amended to the present title.

Contents 
The collection contains roughly 1,000 kyōka, in ten volumes. The volumes' topics are, respectively, "Spring", "Summer", "Autumn", "Winter", "Felicitations (and Shinto)", "Partings (and Travel)", "Love", "Miscellaneous I (Names of Things and Acrostic Poetry)", "Miscellaneous II", and "Buddhism".

References

Citations

Works cited 

 

17th-century poetry
Edo-period works
Waka (poetry)
Japanese poetry